NADH:ubiquinone reductase (Na+-transporting) ( is an enzyme with systematic name NADH:ubiquinone oxidoreductase (Na+-translocating). In bacteria, three different types of respiratory NADH:quinone oxidoreductases (NQr) have been described: the electrogenic complex I, also called NDH I in bacteria, the non-electrogenic NADH:quinone oxidoreductases (NDH II), and the Na+-translocating NADH:quinone oxidoreductases Na+-NQr. The common function of these transmembrane enzymes in respiration is to oxidize NADH using ubiquinone (Q) as electron acceptor. The net reaction thus yields ubiquinol (QH2), the reducing substrate of enzyme complexes further along the respiratory chain, and NAD+, which is used as oxidizing agent in numerous cellular processes.

 NADH + H+ + ubiquinone + n Na+in → NAD+ + ubiquinol + n Na+out
The enzyme is iron-sulfur flavoprotein.

References

External links 
 

EC 1.6.5